Where on Earth?? is a South Korea variety show program on KBS2 starring Jo Se-ho, Cha Tae-hyun,  and Ji Jin-hee. The show airs on KBS2 starting June 1, 2018 and ended on August 31, 2018. The program also airs on KBS World with English subtitles.

Synopsis 
Ji Jin-hee, Cha Tae-hyun, Jo Se-ho and  go on an expedition to explore and experience the sublimity of the unpredictable Mother Nature!

Guests 

 Nam Young-ho (1st Expedition)
 James Hooper (2nd Expedition)

Expedition locations

Original soundtrack

Ratings 

 Ratings listed below are the individual corner ratings of Where On Earth. (Note: Individual corner ratings do not include commercial time, which regular ratings include.)

Notes

Awards and nominations

References

External links 
  
 

2018 South Korean television series debuts
Korean Broadcasting System original programming
Korean-language television shows
South Korean reality television series
South Korean travel television series
South Korean variety television shows
Television series by Monster Union
2018 South Korean television series endings